Abdul Manaf Mudasiru (born 15 May 1995) is a Ghanaian professional footballer who plays as a forward for Ghanaian Premier League side Accra Great Olympics.

Career 
Mudasiru moved to Accra Great Olympics ahead of the 2020–21 Ghana Premier League. He was named on the team's squad list for the season. He made his debut for the club in the first match of the season on 15 November 2020 against Medeam SC. He played the full 90 minutes of the match to help them to a 1–1 draw. On 30 January 2021 during the Ga Mashie Derby, he played the full 90 minutes in a historic 2–0 win over rivals Accra Hears of Oak, the first derby win for Olympics since 2004. On 2 February 2021, he provided the an assist to Charles Danso Otu in the 34th minute to score the first goal and help them to a 3–1 victory against King Faisal Babies, which pushed the Dade Boys to the top of the league as joint leaders with 21 points along with Karela United after match day 12.

References

External links 

 

Living people
1995 births
Association football forwards
Ghanaian footballers
Ghana Premier League players
Accra Great Olympics F.C. players